The Croatian Spring, or Maspok, was a political conflict that took place from 1967 to 1971 in the Socialist Republic of Croatia, at the time part of the Socialist Federal Republic of Yugoslavia. As one of six republics comprising Yugoslavia at the time, Croatia was ruled by the League of Communists of Croatia (SKH), nominally independent from the League of Communists of Yugoslavia (SKJ), led by President Josip Broz Tito. The 1960s in Yugoslavia were marked by a series of reforms aimed at improving the economic situation in the country and increasingly politicised efforts by the leadership of the republics to protect the economic interests of their respective republics. As part of this, political conflict occurred in Croatia when reformers within the SKH, generally aligned with the Croatian cultural society , came into conflict with conservatives.

In the late 1960s, a variety of grievances were aired through , which were adopted in the early 1970s by a reformist faction of the SKH led by Savka Dabčević-Kučar and Miko Tripalo. The complaints initially concerned economic nationalism. The reformists wished to reduce transfers of hard currency to the federal government by companies based in Croatia. They later included political demands for increased autonomy and opposition to real or perceived overrepresentation of the Serbs of Croatia in the security services, politics, and in other fields within Croatia. A particular point of contention was the question of whether the Croatian language was distinct from Serbo-Croatian.

The Croatian Spring increased the popularity of figures from Croatia's past, such as the 19th century Croat politician and senior Austrian military officer, Josip Jelačić, and the assassinated leader of the Croatian Peasant Party, Stjepan Radić, as well as an increase in patriotic songs, works of art, and other expressions of Croatian culture. Plans were made for increased representation of Croatia-related materials in the school curriculum, measures to address the overrepresentation of Serbs in key positions in Croatia and to amend the Constitution of Croatia to emphasise the nature of the republic as the national state of Croats. There were also demands for increased powers for the constituent republics at the expense of Yugoslavia's federal government. These issues increased tensions between Croats and the Serbs of Croatia, as well as between the reformist and conservative factions of the SKH.

While other republics, the SKJ, and Tito himself were not initially involved in the internal Croatian struggle, the increasing prominence of Croatian nationalism led Tito and the SKJ to intervene. Similar to reformers in other Yugoslav republics, the SKH leadership was compelled to resign. Nevertheless, their reforms were left intact and most demands of the ousted leadership were later adopted, ushering in a form of federalism that contributed to the subsequent breakup of Yugoslavia.

Background

Economic crisis

In the early 1960s, the Federal People's Republic of Yugoslavia was a federation according to its constitution (comprising the people's republics of Bosnia and Herzegovina, Croatia, Macedonia, Montenegro, Serbia, and Slovenia), but de facto operated as a centralised state. The Yugoslav economy was in recession, prompting economic reforms, which were hastily implemented and proved ineffective. By 1962, the country's economic difficulties worsened, prompting debate on the foundations of the economic system. In March 1962, President Josip Broz Tito convened the extended central committee of the country's ruling party, the League of Communists of Yugoslavia (SKJ), to discuss the role of the SKJ and the relationship between the central government and the constituent republics. The meeting exposed a clash between Serbs, openly supported by a Serb deputy prime minister Aleksandar Ranković, and Slovene members of the body, particularly Miha Marinko and Sergej Kraigher, cautiously supported by Slovene deputy prime minister Edvard Kardelj. The Slovene delegation advocated for devolving power and authority to the constituent republics. The Serb delegation sought to preserve the central government's monopoly on decision-making and the distribution of tax revenue to less-developed republics. As it was less developed than PR Slovenia and PR Croatia, PR Serbia would have benefited from such an arrangement. In 1963, a new constitution was adopted, granting additional powers to the republics, and the 8th Congress of the SKJ expanded the powers of the SKJ branches the following year.

Politicisation of reforms
Further economic reforms were adopted in 1964 and 1965, transferring considerable powers from the federation to the republics and individual companies. Some of the reform measures exacerbated conflict between the banks, insurers, and foreign trade organisations owned by the Yugoslav government versus those owned by the constituent republics, a conflict that became increasingly political and nationalist. Competing alliances were established. Ranković gained the support of Bosnia and Herzegovina and Montenegro, in addition to Serbia. Slovenia was supported by Croatia, based on the belief of Vladimir Bakarić—the Secretary of the Central Committee of the League of Communists of Croatia (SKH)—that decentralisation would benefit others in Yugoslavia. Bakarić persuaded Krste Crvenkovski, the head of the League of Communists of Macedonia (SKM), to support the Slovene–Croatian reformist bloc, which managed to enact substantial legislation curbing federal powers in favour of the republics. The conflict was framed as a contest between Serbia's interests against those of Slovenia and Croatia.

In Croatia, positions adopted by Ranković's allies in the League of Communists of Serbia (SKS) and the League of Communists of Montenegro (SKCG) were interpreted as hegemonistic, which in turn increased the appeal of Croatian nationalism. By the mid-1960s, the United States consul in Zagreb, Helene Batjer, estimated that about half of SKH members and 80 percent of the population of Croatia held nationalist views.

Peak of the reformist forces

By early 1966, it was clear that the reforms had not produced the desired results. The SKJ blamed the Serbian leadership for resistance to the reforms. In early 1966, Kardelj persuaded Tito to remove Ranković from the SKJ Central Committee and dismiss him as vice president of Yugoslavia. Ranković was accused of plotting to seize power, disregarding the decisions of the eighth congress of the SKJ (December 1964), abuse of the State Security Administration directly or through allies, and illegally wire-tapping the SKJ leadership, including Tito himself. Tito saw Ranković's removal as an opportunity to implement greater decentralisation. In devolving power to constituent units of the federation, Tito assumed the role of sole arbiter in inter-republican disputes.

In 1967 and 1968, the Yugoslav constitution was amended once again, further reducing federal authority in favour of the constituent republics. The peak of the reformist coalition occurred at the 9th congress of the SKJ in March 1969, during which decentralisation of all aspects of the country was proposed. A World Bank loan for the construction of motorways caused a major rift in the reformist coalition after the federal government decided to shelve plans to develop a highway section in Slovenia and build one highway section in Croatia and one in Macedonia instead. For the first time, a constituent republic (Slovenia) protested a decision of the federal government, but Slovene demands were rejected. The situation became heated, prompting the Slovene authorities to publicly state that they had no plan to secede. In the aftermath of the affair, the Slovenian authorities withdrew their support for the reformist coalition. Regardless, the SKH and the SKM pressured the SKJ to adopt the principle of unanimity in decision-making, obtaining veto power for the republican branches of the SKJ in April 1970.

Student demonstrations erupted in Belgrade in June 1968 against authoritarian aspects of the Yugoslav regime, market reforms, and their impact on Yugoslav society. The students were inspired by the worldwide protests of 1968, and criticism of the reforms leveled by the Marxist humanist Praxis School. They opposed decentralisation and criticised nationalism in Yugoslavia through the Praxis journal. In November 1968, Petar Stambolić and other SKS leaders whose political views were a blend of communist dogmatism and Serbian nationalism, were removed on Tito's initiative. Tito specifically blamed Stambolić for not stopping the student demonstrations in a timely fashion. The replacements were Marko Nikezić, as the president, and Latinka Perović as the secretary of the SKS, respectively. Nikezić and Perović supported market-based reforms and a policy of non-interference in other republics' affairs except where officials from those republics denounced Serbian nationalism outside of Serbia.

National revival

Grievances
By the end of the 1960s, the economic reforms had not resulted in discernible improvement within Croatia. Belgrade-based federal banks still dominated the Yugoslav loan market and foreign trade. Croatia-based banks were pushed out from Dalmatia, a popular tourist region, and hotels there were gradually taken over by large companies based in Belgrade. Croatian media reported that favourable purchase agreements for Serbian companies were the result of political pressure and bribery, and the situation was framed as an ethnic rather than economic conflict.

Furthermore, the situation was worsened by a perception among Croatian nationalists of cultural and demographic threats to Croatia from the following policies: use of school textbooks to suppress Croatian national sentiment, a campaign to standardise the Serbo-Croatian language in a way favouring Serbian dialects, demographic displacement by Serbs, and encouragement of Dalmatian regionalism. Calls for the establishment of autonomous Serbian provinces in Dalmatia and elsewhere in Croatia, seen as a threat to Croatia's territorial integrity, added to these concerns. Many people in Croatia believed these to be substantive threats intended to weaken the republic, and rejected alternate explanations of them attributing the changes to economic phenomena or results of modernisation. In the article, Šegedin accused the Yugoslav government of attempting cultural assimilation of Croatia.

Language question

In 1967, the first two volumes of the Dictionary of Serbo-Croatian Literary and Vernacular Language based on the 1954 Novi Sad Agreement were published, sparking controversy about whether Croatian was a separate language. Both volumes excluded common Croatian expressions or treated them as local dialect while Serbian variants were often presented as the standard. The unrelated 1966 Serbo-Croatian dictionary published by  further inflamed the situation by omitting the term "Croat" from the vocabulary.

The Declaration on the Name and Status of the Croatian Literary Language was issued by 130 Croatian linguists, including 80 communists, on 17 March 1967. The declaration criticised the 1967 dictionary and called for official recognition of Croatian as a separate language and for a requirement for the government of Croatia to use the Croatian language in official business. This step would have disadvantaged the many Serb bureaucrats in Croatia. The declaration drew "A Proposal for Reflection" in response, drafted by 54 Serbian writers calling for TV Belgrade to use Cyrillic script and to provide education for the Serbs of Croatia in the Serbian language. There were also several denunciations of the declaration on the Name and Status of the Croatian Literary Language from the SKJ within days. The declaration was not universally supported in Croatia. The declaration marked the beginning of the four-year long period of increased Croatian nationalism commonly referred to as the Croatian Spring.

 withdrew from the Novi Sad Agreement on 22 November 1970 because  insisted that Croatian was only a dialect of Serbian.  went on to publish a new Croatian dictionary and orthography manual by Stjepan Babić, Božidar Finka, and Milan Moguš, which was condemned by Serbia. The Croatian nationalists reacted by promoting linguistic purism and by revising school textbooks to increase coverage of Croatian history and culture.  became the rallying point of the nationalist revival, and its economic secretary Šime Đodan was particularly popular. In 1970, 's membership grew from about 2,000 to 40,000, increasing its political influence. It also enabled complaints to Yugoslav Railways, backed by the SKH, that Serbian Ekavian spelling ought to be supplemented with Croatian Ijekavian spelling in all official notices and schedules.

While multiple newspapers and magazines supported , the organisation also introduced its own organ,  (Croatian Weekly), which enthusiastically promoted Croatian nationalism. Edited by Vlado Gotovac, it quickly surpassed the number of subscribers of all other newspapers including , the newspaper of record in Croatia.

SKH factions

The party was led by a reformist faction consisting of SKH Secretary of the Central Committee Savka Dabčević-Kučar and Miko Tripalo, supported by Pero Pirker, Dragutin Haramija, Ivan Šibl, and others. Dabčević-Kučar, Tripalo and Pirker assumed the top positions in the SKH in 1969 with Bakarić's support. In search of support, the conservative faction allied with the Praxis School. Dabčević-Kučar and Tripalo, on the other hand, found support in SKH ranks closer to or associated with  such as Đodan and Marko Veselica. He also wrote a series of articles denouncing , Radio Television Zagreb, and literary magazine {{ill|Hrvatski književni list|lt=Hrvatski književni list|hr}} and Bruno Bušić as a writer contributing to the magazine. On 19 December, Tito criticised Žanko's actions. In January 1970, Dabčević-Kučar accused Žanko of unitarism and of trying to topple the SKH leadership. Žanko was removed from all political functions and the SKH moved closer to 's positions. Some sources, including Perović, mark Žanko's dismissal as the beginning of the Croatian Spring.

Throughout, the SKH's central economic demand was that Croatia be permitted to retain more of its foreign currency earnings. To this end, the SKH maintained good relations with counterparts from Slovenia and Macedonia, and also attempted to secure the support of the League of Communists of Kosovo. Due to its rejection of the SKH's economic agenda, the SKS was dismissed as "unionist" by the SKH despite Nikezić's support for other reforms. The SKH also opposed the under-representation of Croats in the police, security forces, and the military, as well as in political and economic institutions in Croatia as well as across Yugoslavia. The predominance of Serbs in these positions led to widespread calls for their replacement by Croats. At the federal level, Serbs represented about 39 percent of the Yugoslav population, while Croats accounted for about 19 percent. Serbs were over-represented and Croats under-represented in the civil service by a factor of two, accounting for 67 percent and nine percent of civil servants, respectively. Similarly, Serbs made up between 60–70 percent of the officer corps of the Yugoslav People's Army (JNA). In Croatia alone, Serbs represented about 15 percent of the population, but accounted for nearly one-quarter of the SKH's members and more than one-half of the police force.

SKH involvement until mid-1971

In December 1970, the SKH candidate lost the election of student pro-rector of the Zagreb University to an independent, . The remaining student organisations headquartered in Zagreb were taken over by non-communist candidates in April 1971. Dražen Budiša was elected the head of the Zagreb Student Federation, and Ante Paradžik became the head of the Croatian Student Federation.

Within days of the student-body elections, Tito requested that Dabčević-Kučar order the arrests of Šegedin, Marko Veselica, Budiša, Čičak and Đodan, but she declined. This decision made Dabčević-Kučar very popular in Croatia. At a rally of 200,000 people to mark the 26th anniversary of the 1945 fall of Zagreb to the Yugoslav Partisans on 7 May, observers from the United States reported that her speech was interrupted about 40 times by cheering and applause directed at her rather than the SKH. According to the British ambassador to Yugoslavia Dugald Stewart, Dabčević-Kučar and Tripalo were very skilled at use of public political rallies and their speeches drew crowds typically expected only at football matches.

Another set of amendments to the Yugoslav constitution was adopted further restricting federal powers in June 1971. The only powers retained by the federal government were foreign affairs, foreign trade, defence, common currency, and common tariffs. Inter-republic committees were set up to make decisions before ratification by the federal government. The SKH wanted further decentralisation in 1971 to include banking and foreign trade, and changes that would allow Croatia to retain more foreign currency earnings. There were other demands coming from outside the central committee of the SKH, ranging from the establishment of a Croatian military to complete independence. Ultimately the Croatian Spring involved a wide variety of elements including anti-centralists, moderate and extreme nationalists, pro-Ustaše, anti-communists, reformists, democrats and democratic socialists, liberals, and libertarians.

The SKS leadership did not criticise the SKH; on the contrary, Nikezić and Perović defended Croatia's reformist leadership to Tito in 1971. Serbian and Croatian newspapers traded accusations of mutual hostility, nationalism, and unitarism, leading Tito to admit that the SKJ had lost control of the media. In a meeting with the SKH leaders in July 1971, Tito expressed concern with the political situation and offered Tripalo the post of Prime Minister of Yugoslavia to move him away from the SKH, but Tripalo declined. Later that month, the conservative faction managed to gain sufficient support to expel Đodan and Marko Veselica from the SKH as "nationalist ringleaders".

The SKH leaders determined that the Action Programme would be formally adopted or rejected by its next plenary session in November. The SKH arranged another meeting with Tito on 14 September, insisting that he had been misinformed about the situation. After the meeting, Tito said he was convinced that the stories about chauvinism reigning in Croatia were absurd. He also implied that he favoured the SKH's proposal for a reform of Yugoslavia's foreign currency policy. After the meeting, Tripalo suggested that the Action Programme would no longer be considered.

Looking for role models from the past

The Croatian Spring spurred increased interest in Croatian historical figures. A commemorative plaque to Stjepan Radić, the founder of the Croatian Peasant Party (HSS) and a champion of the Croatian cause in pre-war Yugoslavia, was put up in Zagreb, followed by a monument to him in the town of Metković. The city of Šibenik cancelled a plan to erect a monument to the victims of fascism, instead erecting a statue of the medieval Croatian king Peter Krešimir IV. A marching band and a living history troop named after the 18th-century Trenck's Pandurs were re-established in Požega in 1969. There were also unsuccessful calls to restore a monument to the 19th-century Ban of Croatia Josip Jelačić, which had been removed from Zagreb's central square by the SKH in 1947.

Traditional Croatian patriotic songs—some of them banned—experienced a resurgence in popularity. The most popular and controversial singer of such songs at the time was Vice Vukov.  returned to formal use as a patriotic song when a plaque was placed in the Zagreb Cathedral commemorating the noblemen involved in the 17th-century Magnate conspiracy. The opera , retelling the 16th-century Siege of Szigetvár, was regularly sold out whenever it played at the Croatian National Theatre in Zagreb. Paintings by Oton Iveković (1869–1939) depicting events from Croatian history became very popular. Croatia's historical chequy coat of arms became a popular symbol sewn by youths on jackets and berets or applied on stickers to car windshields. In 1969, it was incorporated into the crest of the football club Dinamo Zagreb. While the Yugoslav flag was still flown, it was always paired with the Croatian one. The latter was also used on its own and in overall use in Croatia it outnumbered the Yugoslav flag by ten to one.

The SKH went on to point out the significance of the Catholic Church in Croatian culture and political identity. Dabčević-Kučar later said that the move was motivated by her wish to counterbalance the Serbian Orthodox Church as a "source of Serbian chauvinism". While the Catholic Church did not play an important role in the Croatian Spring, it contributed to the strengthening of national identity by introducing the Cult of Mary as a Croatian national symbol around the same time. This contribution was reinforced by the canonisation of the 14th-century Croatian Franciscan friar and missionary Nicholas Tavelic in 1970.

The SKH maintained that its current policy was rooted in the Partisan legacy, arguing that the Yugoslav federation was not set up as envisaged by the World War II-era State Anti-fascist Council for the National Liberation of Croatia (ZAVNOH); in particular, ZAVNOH's solution to the Croatian question was not implemented. The SKH said that national sentiments were a legitimate expression of interests which must be defended by communists and that Yugoslavia must be organised as a community of national sovereign republics.  published an article by Tuđman praising ZAVNOH. Its cover page carried a photo of the wartime secretary of the Communist Party of Croatia, Andrija Hebrang, whom the SKJ had considered a Soviet spy and a traitor since the 1948 Tito–Stalin split. The article also coincided with a request, ignored by the SKH, to posthumously rehabilitate Hebrang. The initiative was launched as a form of "moral rehabilitation" by anti-communist émigrés including former high-ranking KPJ official Ante Ciliga.

Demands for autonomy and a new constitution
At the time of the Croatian Spring, civic relations between Croats and Serbs in Croatia were increasingly framed by diverging narratives of World War I and especially World War II. While Croats focused on the role of the Royal Serbian Army in the creation of the Serb-dominated Kingdom of Yugoslavia, and killings of collaborationist Ustaše troops and their sympathisers in the 1945 Yugoslav pursuit of Nazi collaborators, Serbs negatively evaluated the Croatian participation in Austria-Hungary's Serbian campaign during World War I, and especially the genocide of Serbs committed by the Ustaše in the Axis puppet state known as the Independent State of Croatia (NDH).

Among Croatian Serbs, Serbian nationalism flared in response to the Croatian national resurgence. By 1969, the cultural society  came to the forefront of Croatian Serb nationalist discourse. By 1971,  demanded that the Serbian language and Cyrillic script be officially used in Croatia alongside the Croatian language and Latin script, as well as legislative safeguards guaranteeing the national equality of Serbs.  rejected the federal model advocated by the ZAVNOH and the SKH, arguing that nationalism was no longer needed in Yugoslavia.

Finally, 's Rade Bulat demanded the establishment of an autonomous province for the Croatian Serbs, and there were calls to grant autonomy for Dalmatia as well. The SKH central committee declared that no region of Croatia could make any legitimate claim to autonomy of any kind and labeled calls for regional Dalmatian autonomy as treason to the Croatian nation. Such responses were in line with the SKH's objective of national homogenisation. To that end, the SKH blocked the option of declaring one's ethnic identity as regional in the 1971 census.

The Serbian philosopher Mihailo Đurić argued that Croatia's constitution should be amended to describe the republic as the national state of not only Croats, but also Serbs. This remark sparked another series of public debates in March 1971 in the context of constitutional reform of Yugoslavia. The SKJ responded by bringing charges against Đurić and imprisoning him.  proposed an amendment to the constitution further emphasising the national character of Croatia. The SKH dismissed the proposal and drafted its own wording, arguing that it was a compromise. Ultimately passed, the SKH's amendment mentioned the Croatian Serbs specifically, but defined Croatia as a "national state" of the Croats, avoiding use of the exact same phrase for the Croatian Serbs. The meaning of this difference in formulations was not explained in the text of the constitution. By mid-September 1971, ethnic tensions had worsened to the point that in northern Dalmatia, some Serb and Croat villagers took up arms in fear of each other.

Outside Croatia

In February 1971, the Croatian nationalist émigré magazine , printed by Branimir Jelić in West Berlin, published a story attributed to its Moscow correspondent claiming that the Warsaw Pact would help Croatia achieve its independence, granting it a status comparable to that enjoyed by Finland at the time. The article also stated that the SKH was collaborating with Ustaše émigrés. The Yugoslav Military Mission in Berlin reported the story to the military intelligence service along with the names of alleged Ustaše émigré operatives in Croatia. The report was initially believed, leading the Yugoslav authorities to become concerned that the Soviet Union might be instigating and aiding the SKH and the Ustaše émigrés. A federal investigation concluded on 7 April that the story was false, and the authorities decided to bury the affair. Immediately, the SKH announced that foreign and domestic enemies of the SKH stood behind the allegations. The same day, Vladimir Rolović, the Yugoslav ambassador to Sweden, was mortally wounded in an unrelated attack by Ustaše émigrés, further escalating tensions. According to Dabčević-Kučar, the SKH leadership treated the enthusiasm of the émigrés with suspicion, believing it to be linked with the Yugoslav State Security Administration, and also because their activity weakened the SKH's position.

In September,  expanded its work to Bosnia and Herzegovina and the Serbian autonomous province of Vojvodina, claiming Croats were underrepresented in government institutions there due to policies implemented during Ranković's tenure. By November 1971, Croatian nationalists were advocating the annexation of a part of Bosnia and Herzegovina to Croatia to rectify the situation. In response, various Serbian nationalists claimed other parts of Bosnia and Herzegovina for Serbia. Officials from Bosnia and Herzegovina responded by prohibiting the establishment of  branches within the republic.

Foreign policy considerations

During a meeting of the SKJ leadership at the Brijuni Islands on 28–30 April 1971, Tito received a telephone call from Soviet leader Leonid Brezhnev. According to Tito, Brezhnev offered help to resolve the political crisis in Yugoslavia and Tito declined. The offer was likened by the SKH and by Tito to Brezhnev's call to the First Secretary of the Communist Party of Czechoslovakia Alexander Dubček in 1968 ahead of the Warsaw Pact invasion of Czechoslovakia—as being a threat of imminent Warsaw Pact invasion. Some members of the SKH central committee suggested that Tito invented it to strengthen his position, but the First Deputy Premier of the Soviet Union Dmitry Polyansky confirmed the conversation took place.

Aiming to improve the United States' position in the Mediterranean area following the Black September crisis in Jordan, the United States President Richard Nixon toured several countries in the region. Nixon's state visit to Yugoslavia lasted from 30 September until 2 October 1970 and included a trip to Zagreb, where Nixon sparked a controversy in a toast at the Banski dvori, the seat of the Croatian government. His toast ended with the words "Long live Croatia! Long live Yugoslavia!", which were interpreted variously as a show of support for the independence of Croatia, or alternatively as just a common courtesy. The Yugoslav ambassador to the United States interpreted the episode as strategic positioning for a breakup of Yugoslavia.

Brezhnev visited Yugoslavia from 22 to 25 September 1971 amid continuing tension between Yugoslavia and the Soviet Union following the 1968 invasion of Czechoslovakia. Brezhnev offered a friendship agreement, but Tito declined to sign it to avoid appearing to move closer to the Eastern Bloc. Yugoslav officials notified Nixon through Secretary of State William P. Rogers that the meeting with Brezhnev did not go well. An official visit of Tito to the United States was arranged to reassure Tito of the United States' political, economic, and military support for Yugoslavia. Nixon and Tito met on 30 October in Washington, D.C.

Suppression and purges
November plenum and student protest

At the 5 November plenary session of the SKH, Dabčević-Kučar said that the national movement was evidence of the unity of the nation and the SKH, which she said should not be sacrificed to achieve revolutionary purity. After she rejected several of Bakarić's proposals to modify the SKH's policies, the conservative faction—most vocally Bilić and Dragosavac—demanded the enforcement of the August Action Programme. The issue was not resolved by the plenum but, in the aftermath of the session, Bakarić decided to support Bilić and Dragosavac and to ask Tito to intervene. On 12–15 November, Tito visited Bugojno in Bosnia and Herzegovina, where he was hosted by the republic's leadership (Branko Mikulić, Hamdija Pozderac, and ). On 13 November, they were joined by the Yugoslav prime minister, Džemal Bijedić, who criticised the SKH's demands for changing the distribution of foreign currency earnings. Dragosavac met with Tito on 14 and 15 November to discuss the Croatian Spring. On 15 November, Tito was joined by the heads of the JNA to view recordings of political rallies in Croatia where nationalists and SKH members spoke and where anti-Tito shouts could be heard.

The extended SKH central committee secretly met from 17 to 23 November, but the two opposing factions could not agree. On 22 November, about 3,000 Zagreb University students voted to begin a strike the next morning. Initially, they were protesting federal regulations on hard currency, banking and commerce. The protesters singled out Bakarić for sabotaging Tripalo's currency reform. The Croatian Student Federation expanded the strike over all of Croatia. Within days, 30,000 students were on strike demanding the expulsion of Bilić, Dragosavac, Baltić, Ema Derossi-Bjelajac and Čedo Grbić from the SKH as unitarists. On 25 November, Tripalo met with the students, urging them to stop the strike, and Dabčević-Kučar made the same request four days later.

Karađorđevo meeting and the purges

Tito contacted the United States to inform them of his plan to remove the reformist leadership of Croatia, and the United States did not object. Tito considered deploying the JNA, but opted for a political campaign instead. On 1 December, Tito convened a joint meeting of the leaders of the SKJ and the SKH at the Karađorđevo hunting ground in Vojvodina. The SKH leadership was first criticised by SKH conservatives asking for stern action against nationalism. SKJ presidium members from other republics and provinces then gave speeches supporting the conservative stance and the SKH leadership was told to get the situation in Croatia under control. Tito particularly criticised , accusing it of being a political party and attempting to establish a fascist state similar to the NDH. The next day, after the Karađorđevo meeting, Tito's speech was broadcast to all of Yugoslavia, warning of the threat of counter-revolution.

After the broadcast, the student strike was called off and the SKH leadership announced their agreement with Tito. On 6 December, Bakarić criticised the SKH leadership for not taking any practical steps to comply with Tito's speech of two days earlier, especially for not taking action against . Bakarić particularly accused Tripalo of attempting to split the SKH by exaggerating the popular support for the reformists. Two days later, the SKJ leadership met again and concluded that the SKH was not implementing the decisions adopted in Karađorđevo. Leaders of the student strike were arrested on 11 December, and Dabčević-Kučar and Pirker were forced to resign by Tito the next day. At that point, Tripalo, Marko Koprtla and Janko Bobetko immediately also resigned. In the following days, more resignations were tendered, including the head of the government Haramija. Milka Planinc became the head of the SKH. Five hundred students protested in Zagreb against the resignations and were suppressed by riot police.

Subsequently, tens of thousands were expelled from the SKH, including 741 high-ranking officials such as Dabčević-Kučar, Tripalo, and Pirker. Another 280 SKH members were compelled to resign their posts and 131 were demoted. SKH conservatives demanded a major show trial with Tuđman as the main defendant, but Tito blocked this proposal. Instead, Tuđman was convicted of trying to overthrow the "democratic self-managing socialism". Purges targeting media professionals, writers, filmmakers, and university staff continued until late 1972. Even though the purges took place only in the period after the 1 December 1971 Karađorđevo meeting, this date is usually thought of as the end of the Croatian Spring in commemorations of the events. Authorities seized and destroyed 40,000 copies of the Moguš, Finka & Babić orthography manual as chauvinist. The remaining 600 copies were bound without any foreword or index and marked "for internal use only". This version was reprinted by London-based Croatian émigré magazine  (New Croatia) in 1972 and 1984. The complete book was published again in Croatia in 1990.

Aftermath
Maintenance of reforms

Under the new SKH leadership, Ivo Perišin replaced Haramija as the President of its Executive Council in late December 1971. In February 1972, the Croatian Parliament passed a series of 36 amendments to the Constitution of the Socialist Republic of Croatia, one of which introduced  as the republic's anthem.

After the downfall of the reformist SKH leadership, anti-communist émigrés wrote about the Croatian Spring as a movement presaging democratisation and praised Dabčević-Kučar and Tripalo as people of "unusual political virtues". Some émigrés believed that the political situation in Yugoslavia, especially among Croats, was conducive to an uprising. Consequently, nineteen members of the Croatian Revolutionary Brotherhood terrorist organisation launched an armed incursion into Yugoslavia in mid-1972 hoping to incite a rebellion that would lead to the re-establishment of the NDH. After a month of deadly skirmishes with the authorities, the incursion ended in failure.

Pirker died in August 1972, and his funeral drew 100,000 supporters. The size of the crowd attending the funeral confirmed continued broad support for Dabčević-Kučar and Tripalo irrespective of their recent purge.

To reduce the popular support for the Croatian nationalists, Tito granted many of the demands of the ousted SKH leaders. For example, export companies were allowed to retain 20 percent of foreign exchange earnings instead of 7–12 percent while tourism companies increased their retention of foreign currency earnings from 12 percent to 45 percent. Devaluation of the Yugoslav dinar by 18.7 percent increased the value of the retained foreign currency income on the domestic market.

The new SKH leadership was unwilling to undo the changes implemented by their predecessors, and subsequently lost support from the Croatian Serbs. Some Serbs called for the constitution of Croatia to be amended to redefine Croatia as a national state of both Croats and Serbs, and create a Serb committee in the Sabor. Those ideas were defeated by Grbić, who held the position of deputy speaker of the Croatian Parliament; as a result, Serbian nationalists denounced Grbić as a traitor to their cause.

The 1974 Yugoslav Constitution preserved the 1971 reforms almost entirely, expanded the economic powers of the constituent republics, and granted reformist demands related to banking, commerce, and foreign currency.

Legacy in the final decades of Yugoslavia
The term Croatian Spring'' was coined retroactively, after the 1971 purges, by those holding a more favourable view of the events. The latter term was not permitted to be publicly used in Yugoslavia until 1989.

The end of the Croatian Spring ushered in a period known as the Croatian Silence, which lasted until the late 1980s, during which the public kept its distance from the unpopular imposed authorities. Discussion pertaining to the position of the Croatian Serbs was avoided by the new Croatian leadership, and Grbić and others became concerned that the question would be left to the Serbian Orthodox Church and nationalists from Serbia to pose solutions without any counterargument.

The Croatian Spring was a significant event for all of Yugoslavia. Reformist factions in the SKS, SKM and the League of Communists of Slovenia were also suppressed by the end of 1972, replaced by mediocre and obedient politicians. During this period, pressure for the complete breakup of Yugoslavia intensified, religious leaders gained influence, and the Partisan legacy that legitimised the state was weakened. The purges of the 1970s in Croatia and elsewhere in Yugoslavia drove many reformist communists and supporters of social democracy away from politics in the country's final decades.

From 1989, several people previously involved with the SKH or  during the Croatian Spring returned to Croatian politics. Budiša and Gotovac had leading roles in the Croatian Social Liberal Party (HSLS), which was formed before the 1990 Croatian parliamentary election. Čičak was prominent in the HSS. In January 1989, Marko and Vladimir Veselica, Tuđman, Šošić, and Ladan launched an initiative to found the Croatian Democratic Union (HDZ). Dissatisfied with Tuđman's election to lead the HDZ, the Veselica brothers left, and formed the Croatian Democratic Party (HDS) in November. The HDZ gained Stjepan Mesić, another SKH official ousted after the Croatian Spring. Dabčević-Kučar, Tripalo, and Haramija formed the Coalition of People's Accord coalition as independents, supported by several parties including the HSLS and HDS. The HDZ won the elections, Tuđman became the President of the Presidency (later President) and Mesić became the President of the Executive Council (later referred to as Prime Minister).

Notes

References

Sources

Further reading

 
 
 
 
 
 
 

1960s in Croatia
1970s in Croatia
1960s in politics
1970s in politics
Protests in Croatia
Political repression in Yugoslavia
Socialist Republic of Croatia
Socialist Federal Republic of Yugoslavia
Franjo Tuđman